Bergen Station is the main railway station in the city of Bergen, Norway. It is a terminal station on the Bergen Line, and serves trains from Oslo as well as the Bergen Commuter Rail from Arna, Voss and Myrdal. It is located on the east side of the city centre and has four platforms. The station was opened in 1913, four years after the Bergen Line itself opened; it replaced a former main station that was located further west.

Architecture
The station building is one of the grandest in Norway. The architect, Jens Zetlitz Monrad Kielland, designed it in the National Romantic style. He also designed Gamlehaugen, and the stone buildings at Bryggen. The building has been protected against non-trivial modifications since 2003.

History

Having been established in 1921, Norsk Spisevognselskap attempted to find a suitable location for a restaurant in Bergen. There was at the time a small restaurant in the station building, but there was not sufficient space for storage of food. Because of high real estate prices in the area, Norsk Spisevognselskap instead established a kiosk at the station on 1 May 1922.

The same year, 1922, the company contemplated to establish a hotel near the railway station. The plan materialised in the construction of Hotel Terminus, which was owned in part by NSB, in part by Spisevognselskapet and in part by other parties.

On 2 April 1937, Spisevognselskapet established a restaurant in the station.

References

External links

 The Norwegian National Rail Administration's entry on Bergen Railway Station

Railway stations in Bergen
Railway stations on Bergensbanen
Railway stations opened in 1913
1913 establishments in Norway
National Romantic architecture in Norway
Art Nouveau railway stations